Petros Orfanidis (born 23 March 1996) is a Greek professional footballer who plays as a midfielder for Super League 2 club Veria.

International career
Orfanidis was the central figure in Greece U19's 2–0 opening game win against Ukraine U19, scoring the first goal and creating the second, Orfanidis looks back on the victory with UEFA. In Greece's first finals game since losing to Spain U19 in 2012 decider, Giannis Goumas' charges struck early as Xanthi's playmaker Orfanidis found a way past goalkeeper Vadym Soldatenko.

Personal life
Orfanidis' older brother, Lazaros, is also a professional footballer.

Honours
Xanthi
Greek Cup Runner-up: 2014–15

References

External links
 

1996 births
Living people
Greek footballers
Greece youth international footballers
Super League Greece players
Xanthi F.C. players
Veria NFC players
Association football midfielders
Footballers from Xanthi